Bingo or B-I-N-G-O may refer to:

Arts and entertainment

Gaming
 Bingo, a game using a printed card of numbers
 Bingo (British version), a game using a printed card of 15 numbers on three lines; most commonly played in the UK and Ireland
 Bingo (American version), a game using a printed card of numbers in a five-by-five grid; most commonly played in the US and Canada
 Bingo (card game), named by analogy to the game Bingo
 Bingo (Scrabble), a term used in the game Scrabble in North America, for playing all seven of one's tiles

Characters
 Bingo, a character on the 1968–1970 television series The Banana Splits
 Bingo "Bet-it-all" Beaver, one of the main characters from The Get Along Gang
 Bingo Brown, the preteen protagonist of four novels by Betsy Byars
 Bingo Little, a character in a number of books by comic author P. G. Wodehouse
 Bingo Long, the title character of The Bingo Long Traveling All-Stars & Motor Kings (1976), a baseball movie
 Woodrow "Bingo" Wilkin, known as That Wilkin Boy, in a comic book series
 Bingo, a character from the Disney Junior show Puppy Dog Pals
 Bingo, a character from the Australian children's TV show Bluey

Films 
 Bingo (1974 film), a French-Canadian film
 Bingo (1991 film), a film about a dog
 Bingo (1998 film), a computer-animated short film
 Bingo (2012 film), a Japanese horror film

Music

Albums
 Bingo (The Whispers album) (1974), the fourth studio album by The Whispers
 Bingo (Rova Saxophone Quartet album) (1998), an album by the Rova Saxophone Quartet
 Bingo (Bela B. album) (2006), the first solo album of the German singer Bela B., released in 2006
 Bingo! (album) (2010), the sixteenth studio album by the Steve Miller Band

Songs
 "B-I-N-G-O (Bingo)", a song by The Turbans, also recorded by Pat Boone
 "Bingo!" (AKB48 song), a 2007 J-pop song by AKB48
 "Bingo" (folk song), an English children's folk song about a dog
 "Bingo" (Gucci Mane song), a 2010 song by Gucci Mane
 "Bingo", a 1997 song by the English band Catch
 "Bingo" (빙고), a 2004 K-pop song by Koyote
 "Bingo" (빙고), a 2016 K-pop song by 24K
 "Bingo", a B-side from the single "Hands Up (4 Lovers)" (1993) by Right Said Fred
 "Bingo", a single released from soundtrack of Bingo sung by Lise Thouin
 "Bingo", a song from the album Bingo (1974) by The Whispers
 "Bingo", a song from the album The Country of Blinds (1986) by Skeleton Crew
 "Bingo", a song from the album Arular (2005) by M.I.A.

Other arts and entertainment
 "Bingo" (Better Call Saul), a 2015 television episode
 "Bingo" (Roseanne), a 1992 television episode
 Bingo (play), a 1973 play by Edward Bond titled Bingo: Scenes of Money and Death, about the last days of William Shakespeare
Bingo! The Horrifying Eyewitness Account of a Prison Riot (1985), Roger Caron's firsthand account of the 1971 Kingston Penitentiary riot

People
 Bingo (nickname)
 Bingo Gazingo (1925–2010), poet Murray Wachs

Places

Burkina Faso
 Bingo, Boulgou, a town
 Bingo, Boulkiemdé, a town
 Bingo Department

Japan
 Bingo Province, an old province of Japan

United States
 Bingo, Maine, an unincorporated village
 Binghamton, New York, colloquially known as Bingo

Other uses 
 BINGO (telescope), a radio telescope in Uruguay
 Bingo, a multiservice tactical brevity code for a low-fuel state
 BINGO, short for Business-oriented International NGO, or Big International NGO
 Bingo Airways, a defunct Polish charter airline founded in 2011, ceased operations in 2014
 Bingo Stadium, a multi-use stadium in Onomichi, Hiroshima, Japan
 Bingo (supermarket), a supermarket chain in Bosnia and Herzegovina